Plaisance of Gibelet (died 1217) was the daughter of Hugh III Embriaco, Lord of Gibelet, and Stephanie of Milly.

She married Bohemond IV of Antioch, and they had several children including:
Raymond, (1195−1213), died in Tartus
Bohemond V (died 1252), Prince of Antioch
Philip (died 1226), Armenian King of Cilicia
Henry (died 1272), ancestor of the Kings of Cyprus

References

Sources

1217 deaths
Embriaco family
Princesses of Antioch
History of Byblos
Women in war in the Middle East
Women in 13th-century warfare